Parliamentary elections were held in Benin on 18 June 1989. At the time, the country was a one-party state under the People's Revolutionary Party of Benin, with voters given the choice of approving the party's list of 206 candidates for the National Revolutionary Assembly (increased from 196 in the 1984 elections) or not. In the elections 90% of voters approved the list, with 9% voting against. Turnout was 86%.

Following the election, Mathieu Kérékou was re-elected President unopposed by the Assembly on 2 August.

Results

References

Elections in Benin
Benin
Parliamentaru
National Assembly (Benin)
One-party elections
Benin
Election and referendum articles with incomplete results